The Sophisticated Gents is a TV miniseries that aired on three consecutive nights from September 29 to October 1, 1981, on NBC. Its ensemble cast featured a number of African-American stage and film actors, many of whom were customarily seen in blaxploitation films in the 1970s. The miniseries is based upon the 1976 novel The Junior Bachelor Society by John A. Williams. Although production of the project ended in 1979, NBC did not air the miniseries until almost two years later.

Cast
Sonny Jim Gaines - Coach Charles "Chappie" Davis
Bernie Casey - Shurley Walker
Rosey Grier - Cudjo Evers
Robert Hooks - Ezra "Chops" Jackson
Ron O'Neal - Clarence "Claire" Henderson
Thalmus Rasulala - Kenneth "Snake" Dobson
Raymond St. Jacques - D'Artagnan "Dart" Parks
Melvin Van Peebles - Walter "Moon" Porter
Dick Anthony Williams - Ralph Joplin
Paul Winfield - Richard "Bubbles" Wiggins
Albert Hall - Det. Swoop Ferguson
Lynn Benisch - Renee Marcus
Rosalind Cash - Christine Jackson
Ja'net Dubois - Onetha Wiggins
Alfre Woodard - Evelyn Evers
Joanna Miles - Sandra Dobson
Janet MacLachlan - Diane Walker
Bibi Besch - Simone Parks
Denise Nicholas - Pat Henderson
Marlene Warfield - Lil Joplin
Beah Richards - Mae Porter
Stymie Beard - Mickey Mouse
Mario Van Peebles - Nicholas Dobson
René LeVant - Himself

Plot summary
In the mid-1940s, Coach Charles "Chappie" Davis (Gaines) founded a sports club for African-American boys in the local community, dubbing them "The Sophisticated Gents". The young men became athletic heroes, and formed a lifetime bond with each other and their coach. Twenty-five years later, those members of the Gents remaining in town decide to hold a testimonial dinner for Chappie, who is now 70 years old. The dinner turns into an impromptu reunion, with nine Gents eventually arriving to honor Chappie. However, the legal troubles of one of the Gents could spell danger for all of them and their wives.

Video releases
On June 3, 1992, the miniseries was released on VHS.

References

External links
 
 

1981 television films
1981 films
American television films
1980s American television miniseries
Television shows based on American novels
Films about race and ethnicity
1981 drama films
Films directed by Harry Falk (director)